Bahmanshir Bridge at Istgah-e Haft (Pol-e Bahmanshir-e Ābadān-e Istgāh-e Haft), which is commonly referred to as the Istgah-e Haft Bridge (Pol-e Istgāh-e Haft), is a bridge over the Bahmanshir River in the Istgah-e Haft neighborhood of Abadan, Iran. During the early part of the Iran–Iraq War, this bridge played a critical role during the Siege of Abadan, as it was one of only two bridges allowing access to Abadan Island making the key cities of Abadan and Khorramshahr difficult to capture.

On March 10, 2002, the bridge was registered as historical monument #5002 on the list of Registered National Monuments of Iran.

See also 
 Cultural Heritage, Handicrafts and Tourism Organization of Iran

References 

Abadan
Abadan
Abadan
Abadan
Abadan, Iran
Bridges in Iran